Charlie Flanagan (born 1 November 1956) is an Irish Fine Gael politician who has been a Teachta Dála (TD) for the Laois–Offaly constituency since 2020, and previously from 1987 to 2002, 2007 to 2016 and from 2016 to 2020 for the Laois constituency. He was appointed Chair of the Committee on Foreign Affairs and Defence in September 2020. He previously served as Minister for Justice and Equality from 2017 to 2020, Minister for Foreign Affairs and Trade from 2014 to 2017, Minister for Children and Youth Affairs from May to July 2014 and Chair of the Fine Gael Parliamentary Party from 2011 to 2014.

Personal life
His father was Oliver J. Flanagan, an Irish Fine Gael politician who served as Minister for Defence in the late 1970s. Flanagan is married and has two daughters.

Career
Flanagan was first elected to Dáil Éireann at the 1987 general election, succeeding his father Oliver J. Flanagan. He retained his seat at each election until losing it at the 2002 general election, but regained it at the 2007 general election. Flanagan was a member of Laois County Council from 1985 until he stepped down in 2004. He was party Spokesperson on Justice, Equality and Law Reform from 2007 to 2010, and was the party Spokesperson on Children from 2010 to 2011.

He was Chairman of the Fine Gael Parliamentary Party from June 2011 to May 2014.

On 7 May 2014, following the resignation of Alan Shatter as Minister for Justice and Minister for Defence, Flanagan was appointed the following day as Minister for Children and Youth Affairs to succeed Frances Fitzgerald, who assumed the Justice portfolio. On 11 July 2014, Flanagan was appointed as Minister for Foreign Affairs and Trade, succeeding the former Labour leader Eamon Gilmore.

Upon the appointment of Leo Varadkar as Taoiseach on 14 June 2017, Flanagan was appointed as Minister for Justice and Equality. He campaigned in favour of a Yes vote in the 2018 Irish abortion referendum. Flanagan was replaced as Minister for Justice by Helen McEntee on the formation of a new government with Micheál Martin as Taoiseach on 27 June 2020.

British forces commemoration
As Minister for Justice in 2020, Flanagan was behind plans for a state commemoration of the Royal Irish Constabulary (RIC), the police force in Ireland while it was under British rule. This drew widespread criticism from politicians and the public, largely due to the RIC's role in suppressing Irish independence movements, and atrocities by the Black and Tans during the War of Independence. A member of the government-appointed advisory group said they had "recommended a simple ceremony in Dublin Castle, but somebody lost the run of themselves and called it a State event". The backlash forced Flanagan to defer the commemoration, but he committed to holding another in future.

Flanagan supported a memorial wall in Glasnevin Cemetery that drew controversy for commemorating British soldiers alongside Irish revolutionaries. He condemned the decision to take down the wall as a "victory for bullies". Flanagan has also defended his wearing of the remembrance poppy, a historically controversial emblem in Ireland, calling it an "international symbol of remembrance".

References

External links

Charlie Flanagan's page on the Fine Gael website

 

|-

|-

|-

|-

|-

|-

1956 births
Alumni of University College Dublin
Fine Gael TDs
Living people
Local councillors in County Laois
Members of the 25th Dáil
Members of the 26th Dáil
Members of the 27th Dáil
Members of the 28th Dáil
Members of the 30th Dáil
Members of the 31st Dáil
Members of the 32nd Dáil
Members of the 33rd Dáil
Ministers for Foreign Affairs (Ireland)
Ministers for Justice (Ireland)
People from Mountmellick
Politicians from County Laois